South Cape May was a borough that existed in Cape May County, New Jersey, United States, from 1894 to 1945. First settled in 1840, it contained a Lucy-type elephant called Light of Asia.

The borough was formed on August 27, 1894, from portions of Lower Township, based on the results of a referendum held six days earlier.

The borough was badly wrecked by the 1944 Great Atlantic Hurricane, which hit in September of that year. After the hurricane, the borough was dissolved as of April 30, 1945, and returned to Lower Township.

The remaining land not underwater is part of a bird sanctuary (South Cape May Meadows Preserve).

References

Lower Township, New Jersey
Geography of Cape May County, New Jersey
Former boroughs in New Jersey
Ghost towns in New Jersey